Lucy Watson is an English journalist and newsreader, who was employed by ITN for ITV News as a general News Correspondent.

Career

Watson left Daybreak to join ITN in February 2014, under the title of China Correspondent for ITV News, based in Beijing. Currently, she is a general News Correspondent in London.

Controversy 
In a report covering the conflict in Ukraine, she commented that "Now the unthinkable has happened to them. This is not a developing third world nation. This is Europe." This was criticised as offensive.

References

External links

British reporters and correspondents
British television journalists
ITN newsreaders and journalists
ITV Breakfast presenters and reporters
ITV regional newsreaders and journalists
Living people
Year of birth missing (living people)